The 2008 Copa Venezuela was the 39th staging of the Copa Venezuela.

The competition started on August 27, 2008 and concluded on December 11, 2008 with a two leg final, in which Deportivo Anzoátegui won the trophy for the first time with a 2-1 win at home and a 1-0 win away over Estudiantes de Mérida.

First round
The matches were played on 27 August 2008.

|}

Bye: UA Maracaibo, Minervén FC, Monagas SC, Dvo. Táchira, Atl. El Vigía FC, Carabobo FC, Dep. Italia FC, Llaneros FC, Guaros de Lara FC, Estudiantes FC, Portuguesa FC, Dep. Anzoátegui SC, AC Mineros de Guayana, Caracas FC, Zamora FC, Aragua FC and Zulia FC.

Second round
One leg - 2A/2B Division Teams v/s 1 Division Teams. The matches were played on 5–7 September 2008.

|}

Two legs - 1 Division Teams v/s 1 Division Teams. The matches were played on 4-7 September 2008.

|}

Third round
The matches were played on 17 September-1 October 2008.

|}

Quarterfinals
The matches were played on 8-15 October 2008.

|}

Semifinals
The matches were played on 22-29 October and 12-26 November 2008.

|}

Finals
The matches were played on 3-11 December 2008.

|}

Dep. Anzoátegui SC champions and qualify to Copa Nissan Sudamericana 2009.

External links
RSSSF.com
Soccerway.com

Copa Venezuela
2008–09 in Venezuelan football
2008 domestic association football cups